Sally Ride Science at UC San Diego is a nonprofit run by the University of California, San Diego. It was founded as a company in 2001 by Sally Ride, America's first woman in space, along with Tam O'Shaughnessy, Karen Flammer, Terry McEntee, and Alann Lopes to inspire young people in science, technology, engineering, and math (STEM) and to promote STEM literacy. Sally Ride Science was relaunched as a non-profit at UC San Diego on October 1, 2015. It is based at UC San Diego Extension, and its programs are coordinated jointly by UC San Diego Extension, Scripps Institution of Oceanography, and San Diego Supercomputer Center. O'Shaughnessy is executive director and Flammer is director of education for Sally Ride Science at UC San Diego.

Programs 
Sally Ride Science at UC San Diego focuses on professional development for teachers; K-12 STEM + Arts (STEAM) education, including courses, lectures, and camps; and online programs through UCTV. The goal is to help educators build students’ STEM literacy and make connections between what students are learning and the STEM fields that are expected to experience rapid job growth in the coming decades. The nonprofit will create new programs and make use of existing Sally Ride Science programs.

Existing programs include Cool Careers in STEM, which provides professional development for teachers and classroom resources (student books, teacher guides, and a STEM Career Connections Teacher Activity Guide) to awaken students’ interest in STEM topics and careers. Research shows that learning about STEM careers and the diverse people working in these fields inspires students and makes the study of science, technology, engineering, and math more meaningful to them.

Another major existing program is Key Concepts in Science. This integrated standards-based program provides professional development for educators on how to teach science using the 5E instructional model, along with classroom resources (student books, hands-on investigations, teacher guides, and assessments) that educators can use to build students’ STEM literacy and college and career readiness. The program reflects research showing that teaching fewer science concepts in greater depth gives students a solid foundation to develop STEM literacy.

Activities

Before its acquisition by UC San Diego, Sally Ride Science implemented a variety of STEM-related educational initiatives.

References

Sally Ride
Education literature
Books about education
Women and education
Science education in the United States
Popular science books
Educational materials
United States educational programs
University of California, San Diego
Organizations established in 2001
2001 establishments in California